D4 (or D4 Mortal Unit) is a 2010 horror film, directed and written by Darrin Dickerson. It stars Vicki Askew, Ella Bell and Eric Berner.

Plot

D4 follows a team of special ops mercenaries on a mission to rescue a kidnapped kid believed to be held in an abandoned government facility. Hired by the boy's mother, a wealthy doctor with high reaching influence, all seems to be an easy job. But as things unfold, what was meant to be a simple search and rescue turns into a fight for survival.

Cast

References

External links
 
 

2010 films
American science fiction action films
2010 horror films
2010s science fiction horror films
2010s monster movies
American action horror films
American science fiction horror films
2010s English-language films
2010s American films